Scopula wegneri is a moth of the  family Geometridae. It is found on Java.

References

Moths described in 1935
Taxa named by Louis Beethoven Prout
wegneri
Moths of Indonesia